The 1947 Cincinnati Bearcats football team was an American football team that represented the University of Cincinnati as a member of the Mid-American Conference (MAC) during the 1947 college football season. In its third season under head coach Ray Nolting, the team compiled an overall record of 7–3 record with a mark of 3–1 against conference opponents, winning the MAC championship.

Schedule

References

Cincinnati
Cincinnati Bearcats football seasons
Mid-American Conference football champion seasons
Ohio Bobcats football|Cincinnati Bearcats football